

Don't Be Happy... Just Worry is a mini-album by The Wildhearts, initially released in 1992 by Eastwest Records as a double EP. It was re-issued on 25 April 1994 as a single-CD and cassette mini-album, both formats with all eight tracks. The first disc (tracks 1–4 on the single disc version) consists of a remixed version of the Mondo Akimbo a-Go-Go EP. All eight songs were included on the 2010 CD release of Earth Vs The Wildhearts.

Lead track "Turning American", sometimes incorrectly assumed to be an anti-American statement, is actually about people, particularly successful musicians, who do not stick to their roots.

Track listing

Disc one
"Turning American"
"Crying Over Nothing"
"Nothing Ever Changes But the Shoes"
"Liberty Cap"

Disc two
"Splattermania"
"Something Weird (Going on in My Head)"
"Weekend (5 Long Days)"
"Dreaming in A"

References

1992 EPs
The Wildhearts EPs